Saint-Sulpice or Saint Sulpice may identify:

People
Sulpicius Severus, known as Saint Sulpice (c. 360–c. 420), who wrote the earliest biography of Saint Martin of Tours
Sulpitius the Pious, known as Saint Sulpice, who died around 646 AD
Sulpitius I of Bourges the Severe (died 591)
 9th Century Bishop of Bayeux
General Raymond-Gaspard de Bonardi de Saint-Sulpice, who fought during the Napoleonic Wars

Places
Belgium
Church of Saint-Sulpice, Jumet, a church in Jumet, section of Charleroi
Canada
Saint-Sulpice, Quebec, a municipality 
 Saint-Sulpice (Montreal), a district in the borough of Ahuntsic-Cartierville in Montreal
France
, in the Ille-et-Vilaine department, Brittany
Church of Saint-Sulpice, Paris, a church in central Paris
 Place Saint-Sulpice, a large square next to the church
  in the Calvados department, Normandy
Saint-Sulpice, Ain, in the Ain department
Saint-Sulpice, Haute-Saône, in the Haute-Saône department
Saint-Sulpice, Lot, in the Lot department
Saint-Sulpice, Maine-et-Loire, in the Maine-et-Loire department
Saint-Sulpice, Mayenne, in the Mayenne department
Saint-Sulpice, Nièvre, in the Nièvre department
Saint-Sulpice, Oise, in the Oise department
Saint-Sulpice (Paris Metro), a subway station in Paris
Saint-Sulpice, Puy-de-Dôme, in the Puy-de-Dôme department
Saint-Sulpice, Savoie, in the Savoie department
Saint-Sulpice, Tarn, in the Tarn department
 Saint-Sulpice-d'Arnoult, in the Charente-Maritime department
 Saint-Sulpice-de-Cognac, in the Charente department
 Saint-Sulpice-de-Faleyrens, in the Gironde department
 Saint-Sulpice-de-Favières, in the Essonne department
 Saint-Sulpice-de-Grimbouville, in the Eure department
 Saint-Sulpice-de-Guilleragues, in the Gironde department
 Saint-Sulpice-de-Mareuil, in the Dordogne department
 Saint-Sulpice-de-Pommeray, in the Loir-et-Cher department
 Saint-Sulpice-de-Pommiers, in the Gironde department
 Saint-Sulpice-de-Roumagnac, in the Dordogne department
 Saint-Sulpice-de-Royan, in the Charente-Maritime department
 Saint-Sulpice-de-Ruffec, in the Charente department
 Saint-Sulpice-des-Landes, Ille-et-Vilaine, in the Ille-et-Vilaine department
 Saint-Sulpice-des-Landes, Loire-Atlantique, in the Loire-Atlantique department
 Saint-Sulpice-des-Rivoires, in the Isère department
 Saint-Sulpice-d'Excideuil, in the Dordogne department
 Saint-Sulpice-en-Pareds, in the Vendée department
 Saint-Sulpice-et-Cameyrac, in the Gironde department
 Saint-Sulpice-la-Forêt, in the Ille-et-Vilaine department
 Saint-Sulpice-Laurière, in the Haute-Vienne department
 Saint-Sulpice-le-Dunois, in the Creuse department
 Saint-Sulpice-le-Guérétois, in the Creuse department
 Saint-Sulpice-les-Bois, in the Corrèze department
 Saint-Sulpice-les-Champs, in the Creuse department
 Saint-Sulpice-les-Feuilles, in the Haute-Vienne department
 Saint-Sulpice-le-Verdon, in the Vendée department
 Saint-Sulpice-sur-Lèze, in the Haute-Garonne department
 Saint-Sulpice-sur-Risle, in the Orne department

Switzerland
Saint-Sulpice, Neuchâtel
Saint-Sulpice, Vaud

See also
Society of Saint-Sulpice (the Sulpitians), a Catholic religious order
 Sister San Sulpicio (disambiguation)
 Sulpicio (disambiguation)
 Sulpicius